Mary Pierce and Rennae Stubbs were the defending champions, but had different outcomes. While Pierce did not compete this year, Stubbs partnered with Cara Black, but they lost in first round to Daniela Hantuchová and Chanda Rubin.

Nadia Petrova and Meghann Shaughnessy won the title, defeating Conchita Martínez and Virginia Ruano Pascual 6–7(2–7), 6–4, 6–3 in the final. It was the 5th title of the year for the pair, and the 9th title for both Petrova and Shaughnessy in their respective careers.

Seeds

Draw

Draw

External links
 Main and Qualifying Draws

JPMorgan Chase Open Doubles
2004 Women's Doubles